Tungshan District, formerly Shantzuting District, was one of administrative districts of Chiayi City in 1945.

See also 
 Chiayi City

References 

Chiayi
Former districts of Taiwan